Moottori (meaning Engine in English) is the oldest automobile magazine published in Helsinki, Finland.

Profile
Moottori is published ten times per year by Aikakauslehdet Oy. The magazine has its headquarters in Helsinki. It is the member magazine of the Automobile and Touring Club of Finland (ATCF) (in Finnish Autoliitto). The magazine has car tests, travel articles and articles on Finnish traffic policy.

The circulation of Moottori was 83,000 copies in 2007. It was 92,208 copies in 2009. Its circulation rose to 102,497 copies in 2011 and to 103,914 copies in 2012. The magazine had a circulation of 108,742 copies in 2013.

See also
 List of magazines in Finland

References

External links
Official website

1925 establishments in Finland
Automobile magazines published in Finland
Finnish-language magazines
Magazines established in 1925
Magazines published in Helsinki
Monthly magazines published in Finland
Ten times annually magazines